"Breathe Easy" is a song written by Lars Halvor Jensen, Martin Michael Larsson and Lee Ryan and released by the British boy band Blue. The song was included on their third studio album, Guilty (2003). It was released as a single on 22 March 2004 in the United Kingdom and reached number four on the UK Singles Chart.

An Italian version of the song, entitled "A chi mi dice" (English: "To Those Who Tell Me"), was released as a single in France and Italy, with lyrics written by Tiziano Ferro. This version topped the Italian Singles Chart for eight weeks was Italy's best-selling single of 2004. It also charted in France, where it peaked at number 15.

Critical reception
The song received mixed to positive reviews from contemporary music critics. Tiscali Music's review said of band-member and song co-writer "Lee Ryan proves to be more than just a pretty face with his co-written ballad 'Breathe Easy'", while they wrote about the song "'Breathe Easy' is a hauntingly beautiful track" and "[Blue] are fast becoming one of the biggest bands in Britain and with this majestic song they've just taken another step towards the pop summit". In an album review by The Guardians Betty Clarke, "Breathe Easy" was described as a "Westlife-ish horror".

Track listings

"Breathe Easy"
UK CD1 and European CD single
 "Breathe Easy" (album edit)
 "Breathe Easy" (Love 4 Music Remix featuring Jaime Summaz)

UK CD2
 "Breathe Easy" (album edit)
 "Taste It" (live from the tour)
 "Whatever Happens"
 Enhanced section
 "Breathe Easy" (video)
 Opening footage from tour
 Live performance of "Guilty"
 Behind the scenes and audience footage
 Tour footage and interview with band

Japanese CD single
 "Breathe Easy" (album edit)
 "Breathe Easy" (Love 4 Music Remix featuring Jaime Summaz)
 "Taste It" (live from the tour)
 "Whatever Happens"

"A chi mi dice"
Italian CD single
 "A chi mi dice"
 "Breathe Easy" (album edit)
 "Taste It" (live from the tour)
 "Whatever Happens"

French CD single
 "A chi mi dice" – 4:34
 "Breathe Easy" – 4:41
 "A chi mi dice" (video) – 4:34
 "Breathe Easy" (video) – 4:41

Credits and personnel
Credits for "Breathe Easy" are lifted from the UK CD1 liner notes. Additional personnel for "A chi mi dice" are lifted from the Italian CD single liner notes.

Studio
 Recorded at DeeKay Studios (Copenhagen, Denmark)
 Additional vocals recorded at Metropolis Studios (London, England) and Sanctuary Studios (Watford, England)
 Strings recorded at Polar Studios (Stockholm, Sweden)
 Mixed at the White Room (Copenhagen, Denmark)

Personnel

 Lee Ryan – writing
 Lars Halvor Jensen – writing, all other instruments, production, vocal production, arrangement
 Martin Michael Larsson – writing, all other instruments, programming, production, arrangement, mixing ("A chi mi dice")
 Tiziano Ferro – lyrics ("A chi mi dice")
 Josh – guitars
 Stockholm Session Strings – strings
 Ulf Forsberg – concertmaster
 Henrik Janson – string arrangement, conducting
 Ulf Janson – string arrangement, conducting
 Mads Nilsson – mixing
 Håkan Wollgård – engineering
 Andrew Murabito – sleeve artwork
 Max Dodson – photography

Charts

"Breathe Easy"

Weekly charts

Year-end charts

"A chi mi dice"

Weekly charts

Year-end charts

Certifications

References

2000s ballads
2003 songs
2004 singles
Blue (English band) songs
Innocent Records singles
Number-one singles in Italy
Pop ballads
Songs written by Lars Halvor Jensen
Songs written by Lee Ryan
Songs written by Martin M. Larsson
Virgin Records singles